Robert Joseph "Rip" Collins (September 18, 1909 – April 19, 1969) was an American backup catcher in Major League Baseball who played for the Chicago Cubs (1940) and New York Yankees (1944). Collins batted and threw right-handed. He was born in Pittsburgh, Pennsylvania.

In a two-season career, Collins was a .211 hitter with one home run and 14 RBI in 50 games played.

Collins died in his hometown of Pittsburgh at the age of 59.

External links
Baseball Reference

Chicago Cubs players
New York Yankees players
Major League Baseball catchers
Baseball players from Pittsburgh
1909 births
1969 deaths